Miracle in Milan is a 1951 Italian fantasy film directed by Vittorio De Sica.  The screenplay was co-written by Cesare Zavattini, based on his novel Totò il Buono.  The picture stars Francesco Golisano, Emma Gramatica, Paolo Stoppa, and Guglielmo Barnabò.

The film, told as a neo-realist fable, explains the lives of a poverty-stricken group in post-war Milan, Italy.

Plot
This fantasy tale tells of Totò who, found as a baby in a cabbage patch, is adopted by Lolotta, a wise and kind old woman. When Lolotta dies he moves to an orphanage. At adulthood Totò (Francesco Golisano) leaves the orphanage and ends up in a shantytown squatter colony on the outskirts of Milan.

Totò's organizational ability, learned at the orphanage, and his simple kindness and optimistic outlook acquired from Lolotta bring structure to the colony. He fosters a sense of happiness and well-being among the dispossessed who live there.

Businessmen come and haggle over the ownership of the land but the squatters are left alone to live there.

Oil is discovered under the colony when they are making a hole for a maypole during a festival. It forms a fountain in the middle of the camp and at first is thought to be water.

Mobbi the land owner hears about the oil from the scheming squatter, Rappi, and tries to evict the squatters  using an army of police.

During this crisis Totò is given a magic dove by the ghost of Lolotta and he uses its powers to grant wishes to those who ask. The camp takes on a surreal appearance as every secret wish is granted.

Eventually the dove is taken back by two angels who object to a mortal using its magic powers.

Without the protection of the dove the camp is overrun by police and its occupants taken away in  police wagons to be imprisoned.

Toto's sweetheart, Edvige, replaces it with an ordinary dove and hands this to him through the bars of the police wagon in Piazza del Duomo outside Milan's cathedral.

Totò uses the dove to wish for the freedom of his friends and because of his good faith it is granted. The police wagons fall apart and the squatters fly away on broomsticks seized from the street sweepers in Milan's central square.

They circle around the Cathedral and then away, "towards a land where good morning really means good morning."

Cast
 Emma Gramatica as the old lady,  Lolotta
 Francesco Golisano as Totò
 Paolo Stoppa as Rappi, the schemer
 Guglielmo Barnabò as Mobbi, the landowner
 Brunella Bovo as Edvige, Toto's sweetheart
 Anna Carena as Marta, the aristocratic Signora Altezzosa
 Alba Arnova as the statue in the camp square
 Flora Cambi as  Signora Altezzosa's maid and an unhappy lover
 Virgilio Riento as a police sergeant 
 Arturo Bragaglia as Alfredo
 Erminio Spalla as Gaetano
 Riccardo Bertazzolo as the Strong Man
 Checco Rissone as secondary police commander 
 Angelo Prioli as supreme police commander
 Gianni Branduani as Totò at eleven years

Production
The film's principal  location was waste ground, near Milan's Lambrate railway station.

Vittorio De Sica wrote that he made the film in order to show how the "common man" can exist given the realities of life: "It is true that my people have already attained happiness after their own fashion; precisely because they are destitute, these people still feel - as the majority of ordinary men perhaps no longer do - the living warmth of a ray of winter sunshine, the simple poetry of the wind. They greet water with the same pure joy as Saint Francis did."

The Milan Cathedral serves as a focal location in the film, and can also be viewed as symbolic of the miracle to which the film's title refers.

American special effects specialist Ned Mann was hired for the film. The picture would be Mann's final project. Vittorio De Sica, in neo-realist fashion, used both professional and non-professional actors.

Reception

Critical response
The film premiered in Italy on 8 February 1951.  Later it was presented at the Cannes Film Festival in April 1951. In the United States it opened wide on December 17, 1951.

Bosley Crowther, film critic for The New York Times, liked the film and wrote, "The rich vein of sly, compassionate humor that Charlie Chaplin and René Clair used to mine with unparalleled genius when they were turning out their best satiric films, has been tapped by Vittorio De Sica in his Miracle in Milan, the widely proclaimed Italian picture that arrived at the World yesterday. And although this uncommon vein of fancy is away from De Sica's previous line, the great director has brought up from his digging a liberal return of purest gold." The film ranked 3rd on Cahiers du Cinéma's Top 10 Films of the Year List in 1951.

The staff at Variety magazine gave the film a positive review and wrote, "The sharp satire on the oil-greedy industrialist is handled in a broader, perhaps exaggerated manner, and pic is liberally sprinkled with intelligent humor, much of it ironic.  Performances by pros and tyros alike are flawless."

Review website Rotten Tomatoes reports the film has a rare 100% "Fresh" rating. In April 2019, a restored version of the film was selected to be shown in the Cannes Classics section at the 2019 Cannes Film Festival.

Awards
Wins
 1951 Cannes Film Festival: Grand Prize of the Festival, Vittorio De Sica; 1951.
 Italian National Syndicate of Film Journalists: Silver Ribbon; Best Production Design, Guido Fiorini; 1951.
 New York Film Critics Circle Awards: NYFCC Award; Best Foreign Language Film, Italy; 1951.
 National Board of Review: National Board of Review Awards 1951, Best Foreign Films; 1951.

Nominations
 British Academy of Film and Television Arts: BAFTA Film Award, Best Film from any Source, Italy; Best Foreign Actor, Francesco Golisano, Italy; 1952.

References

External links
 
 
 Miracle in Milan review by Tom Lamont The Guardian
 Miracle in Milan at DVD Beaver (includes images)
  
 
 

1951 films
1950s fantasy comedy films
Films based on fantasy novels
Films directed by Vittorio De Sica
Films set in Milan
Italian black-and-white films
Italian comedy films
Italian fantasy films
Italian neorealist films
1950s Italian-language films
Palme d'Or winners
Political drama films
Films based on Italian novels
Films with screenplays by Cesare Zavattini
Films with screenplays by Suso Cecchi d'Amico
Squatting in Italy
Squatting in film
1951 comedy films
Films scored by Alessandro Cicognini
1950s Italian films
Films based on works by Cesare Zavattini